Oh Well may refer to:

 Oh Well (band), a German dance group that started in the late 1980s
 Oh Well (album), an album by Insomniac Folklore
 Oh Well (card game), the original version of the card game, Oh Hell!

Songs
 "Oh Well" (song), a 1969 song by Fleetwood Mac, covered by several other artists
 "Oh Well", a song by Boyz II Men from their 2002 album Full Circle
 "Oh Well", a song by Depeche Mode from their 2009 album Sounds of the Universe (bonus track)
 "Oh Well", a song by Fiona Apple from her 2005 album Extraordinary Machine
 "Oh Well", a song by Snake River Conspiracy from their 2000 album Sonic Jihad